Medulla Grammatice or Medulla Grammaticae ("the Marrow of Grammar") is a collection of fifteenth century Latin–Middle English glossaries in the British Museum and elsewhere.

15th-century books
Middle English
English dictionaries